Transformer-2 protein homolog alpha is a protein that in humans is encoded by the TRA2A gene.

This gene is a member of the transformer 2 homolog family and encodes a protein with two RS domains and an RRM (RNA recognition motif) domain. This phosphorylated nuclear protein binds to specific RNA sequences and plays a role in the regulation of pre-mRNA splicing. Several alternatively spliced transcript variants of this gene have been described; however, the full-length nature of some of these variants has not been determined.

References

Further reading